Lowth is a surname. Notable people with the surname include:

Alfred Lowth (1817-1907), English cricketer
Ambrose Lowth (d. 1545), English politician
Colin Lowth (born 1987), English swimmer
Edward Lowth Badeley (1803/1804–1868), English lawyer
John Lowth (1822–1877), American lawyer
Robert Lowth (1710–1787), English Anglican bishop
Simon Lowth (1636–1720), English clergyman
Thomas Lowth (1858–1931), English politician
William Lowth (1660–1732), English clergyman